Der Eisenrost (literally 'The Iron Rust') is one of the premier industrial "Metal Percussion" units in Tokyo, Japan. They are best known for producing the film soundtrack for Shinya Tsukamoto's Tokyo Fist. Lead man and innovator Chu Ishikawa was notable for the futuristic, often industrial soundtracks for independent film creator Shinya Tsukamoto. Films such as Tetsuo: The Iron Man, Bullet Ballet, and Gemini rank among the best known.  Many of the members are also involved in the band C.H.C. System.

Discography

CDs
 Armored Weapon (Live Documents '93-'94)

DVDs
 The Law of Causality (Live at Shibuya O-NEST 26 May 2004)

VHS
 Live@Shibuya LA MAMA 1998

External links
  Der Eisenrost Official Band web 
 Chu Ishikawa Homepage
 C.H.C. System Homepage (defunct)
 Der Eisenrost DVD info.

Japanese industrial music groups